Malhun (Arabic الملحون / ALA-LC: al-malḥūn), meaning "the melodic poem", is a form of music that originated in Morocco. It is a kind of urban, sung poetry that comes from the exclusively masculine working-class milieu of craftsmen's guilds.

Origins 
The mǝlḥun first emerged as a pure literary creation, as a poetic genre today known in Morocco under the name of "qasida" (meaning "poem") (Arabic: القصيدة) or "zajal" (Arabic: الزجل). It developed in the Tafilalet oases of southern Morocco in the fifteenth century before it spread to other parts of the Maghreb.

The Mal’aba of Al-Kafif az-Zarhuni (ملعبة الكفيف الزرهوني) is considered to be the oldest known form of the Malhun, dating back to the Marinid dynasty era (14th century). The Mal’aba describes the union's attempt of the Maghreb by the sultan Abu al-Hasan Ali ibn Othman. Written in Moroccan Arabic, it represents the origins of the modern Malhun. Ibn Khaldun mentions it at the end of his Muqaddimah as one of the main lyrical epics of the art called "Mala'ib" (ملاعب).

Music 
The qasida (qṣīda in Moroccan Arabic) of the malhun is based on two essential elements: the overtures preceding it and the parts of which it is composed: aqsam (Arabic: الأقسام) verses sung solo interrupted by the harba refrain (meaning launch) (Arabic: الحربة). Harba, the origin of which goes back to the 16th century, is a refrain taken up between the verses. Another refrain called drīdka (Arabic: الدريدكة) is a simplified form of the harba, taking off from an accelerated rhythm to announce the end of a qasida.

Famous figures 
Among the former authors of melhun, there is Abdelaziz al-Maghrawi and  Abderrahman El Majdoub (died 1568) who was famous for his mystical quatrains. In the 18th and 19th centuries, Morocco saw a great number of poets  who, whether from Fez, Meknes or Marrakech, spread popular poetry using the melhun. Examples are Kaddour El Alamy and Thami Midaghri.

In modern days, prominent figures include al-Hajj al-Husayn al-Tulali (1924-1998), Fatima Hadad, Haj Houcine Toulali, and Zohra Al Fassiya. Fatima Hadid started an association in 2004 named Jawg Huwwat fann al-malhun for enthusiasts of Malhun.

See also 
Arabic music
Music of Morocco
Andalusi classical music

References

External links
 Le Malhoun, article de Nature et Culture, auteur Mario Scolas
 Retour de flamme pour le melhoun

North African music
Moroccan music
Arabic music